The Flight Safety Foundation (FSF) is an independent, nonprofit, international organization concerning research, education, advocacy, and communications in the field of aviation safety. FSF brings together aviation professionals from all sectors to help solve safety problems facing the industry. With a membership that spreads throughout the world, FSF brings an international perspective to aviation issues for its members, the media, and the traveling public.

History

Since its founding in 1947, the foundation has acted as a non-profit, independent clearinghouse to disseminate safety information, identify threats to safety, and recommend practical solutions. Today, the foundation provides leadership to more than 1200 members in more than 75 countries.

The Aviation Crash Injury Research (AvCIR) Division became part of FSF in April 1959, being transferred from Cornell University. AvCIR later became Aviation Safety Engineering and Research (AvSER). AvCIR conducted safety research specific to aviation.

Objectives
The foundation's stated objectives are to:

"Pursue the active involvement and participation of the diverse elements of global professional aviation."
"Anticipate, identify and analyze global aviation safety issues and set priorities."
"Communicate effectively about aviation safety."
"Be a catalyst for action and the adoption of best aviation safety practices."

Magazine 
The FSF produces a monthly digital journal titled AeroSafety World which has a controlled circulation that includes all FSF members as well as executives at air carriers, maintenance organizations, industry manufacturers and suppliers, and civil aviation authorities. AeroSafety World is only available electronically.

Seminars and awards 
In partnership with other safety organizations, FSF presents four annual summits—the International Air Safety Summit (IASS), the Business Aviation Safety Summit (BASS), the Singapore Aviation Safety Seminar (SASS), and the Safety Forum. FSF also organizes and sponsors smaller, regional safety events throughout the year.  The foundation gives out annual awards to recognize individual achievements and group achievements in aviation safety.

Aviation Safety Network 

The FSF manages the Aviation Safety Network (ASN), a website that keeps track of aviation accidents, incidents, and hijackings. Its main database contains details of over 23,000 reports (2022) and investigations, news, photos, and statistics. The website has 9900 subscribers and receives about 50,000 visitors per week.

ASN maintains three distinct databases:
 ASN Accident Database: Contains over 23,000 airliner reports (aircraft originally certified to carry 12 or more passengers) as well as military transport and corporate jet accidents dating back to 1919.
 ASN Wikibase: Contains descriptions of over 258,000 accidents and incidents involving light aircraft, military, helicopters, gyroplanes, gliders, hot air balloons and UAVs (unmanned aerial vehicles). It is updated regularly by a large user community.
 ASN Drone Database: Contains over 15,000 unmanned aircraft or drone sightings and incidents.

ASN was founded in January 1996 by Harro Ranter, who currently serves as director and Fabian I. Lujan who manages the website's operations. Harro started gathering information about aircraft accidents since 1983 and wrote a book covering over 1000 accidents in the summer of 1985. Lujan joined the Aviation Safety Web Pages in August 1998.

See also 
Hugh DeHaven
SKYbrary

References 

Aviation safety
Non-profit organizations based in Alexandria, Virginia
Organizations established in 1947
1947 establishments in Virginia
Aviation websites
Online databases